Is Dating Your Sister is the second solo album by American rapper Pigeon John. It was released on Basement Records in 2003.

Track listing

References

External links

2003 albums
Pigeon John albums